WLPK 1580 AM is a radio station broadcasting a classic hits format. Licensed to Connersville, Indiana, the station is owned by Rodgers Broadcasting Corporation.

History
The station began broadcasting April 4, 1948, as WCNB. It was owned by The News-Examiner Company, publisher of the Connersville News-Examiner. Studios were on the second floor of the News-Examiner Building, 406 Central Avenue in Connersville.

On March 17, 2014 WLPK changed its format from oldies to classic hits, branded as "K Mix 106.9" (the frequency in the branding is for FM translator W296BA 106.9 FM in Connersville).

References

External links
WLPK's official website

LPK